Statutes concerning forcible entries and riots confirmed or the Forcible Entry Act 1391 (15 Ric 2 c 2) (1391) was an Act of the Parliament of the Kingdom of England. It provided that the Forcible Entry Act 1381 and one or more other pieces of legislation were to be held and kept and fully executed. It also authorised any justice of the peace, who had received a complaint that such a forcible entry had been committed, to take the power of the county to arrest any person found committing forcible detainer after that forcible entry.

The whole Chapter was repealed for England and Wales on 1 December 1977.

This Act was applied to Ireland by Poynings' Law. This Act was repealed for the Republic of Ireland by section 1 of, and Part II of the Schedule to, the Statute Law Revision Act 1983 (which repealed the whole of the 15 Ric 2, of which this Act is part).

See also
Forcible Entry Act

References
Halsbury's Statutes, Third Edition, Volume 18, page 406
The Statutes, Third Revised Edition, HMSO, 1950

External links
List of legislative effects from the Irish Statute Book

Acts of the Parliament of England
1391 in England
1390s in law